This is a list of properties and districts in Colquitt County, Georgia that are listed on the National Register of Historic Places (NRHP).

Current listings

|}

References

Colquitt
Buildings and structures in Colquitt County, Georgia